Christ Church was a Church of England church in Crewkerne, Somerset, England. It was constructed in 1852–1854 to the designs of James Mountford Allen. Christ Church was demolished in 1975 and the site is now occupied by a residential development, Christchurch Court.

History

Christ Church was built as a chapel of ease to the parish church of St Bartholomew. Owing to Crewkerne's increasing population at the time, the existing accommodation provided by the parish church had become insufficient. By 1842, the town had a population of over 4,000, with the parish church containing 800 sittings, of which only 108 were available to the poor. A new district church was proposed in 1842, but the scheme failed to come to fruition. A vestry meeting held in 1846 resolved to erect galleries in the parish church, but the proposal was abandoned in favour of the construction of a chapel of ease. Some of the town's residents objected to the installation of galleries in the parish church on the grounds that they would "interfere with [the] beauty" of the interior.

A vestry meeting of 1851 saw the formation of a building committee for the chapel of ease scheme. By this time, a site at South Street had been acquired and a substantial donation of £1,000 received from Mr. William Hoskins of North Perrott. Mr. Hoskins expressed his desire to provide the poor of the parish with much-needed church accommodation and requested that two-thirds of the new church's seating be free and unappropriated. He was also against the proposal to erect galleries in the parish church in the fear it would "destroy [its] architectural beauty". The remaining sum required for the new church was raised by public subscription.

The plans for the new church were drawn up by the Crewkerne architect James Mountford Allen and Messrs John Chick of Beaminster hired as the builders. The foundation stone of the church was laid by Mr. Thomas Hoskins of Haselbury Plucknett on 31 August 1852, and the church was consecrated by the Bishop of Bath and Wells, the Right Rev. Robert Eden, on 20 September 1854. The total cost of the church, including endowments, amounted to £3,932.

The church underwent restoration and improvement work in 1878 and reopened in November that year. The vestry was enlarged in 1900 to the designs of Howard Gaye of London. A new organ, built by James Ivimey of Southampton, was dedicated at the church on 13 July 1910 by the Rural Dean, Rev. W. Farrer.

Christ Church was declared redundant by the Church of England on 7 August 1969. It was subsequently sold in 1973, demolished in 1975 and replaced with the residential Christchurch Court. A Blue plaque is now fixed on the front boundary wall to commemorate the former church.

Architecture

Christ Church was built of local stone quarried on the site, with dressings of Hamstone. It was made up of a four-bay nave with clerestory, north aisle, chancel, with a vestry on the north side and an organ chapel on the south side, and north porch. A bellcote was located at the west end of the roof. The arches, windows and other dressings were worked by Charles Trask of Norton-sub-Hamdon. The church's font of Caen stone also featured carved work by Mr. Trask. The church was designed with 410 sittings, 321 of which were free.

References

External links
 Exterior and interior photographs of Christ Church from 1967 in Historic England's England's Places Collection

Crewkerne
Church of England church buildings in South Somerset
Former churches in Somerset
Demolished churches in England
Churches completed in 1854
Buildings and structures demolished in 1975
1854 establishments in England